Falling Awake is a 2016 poetry collection by English poet Alice Oswald, published by Jonathan Cape. Her seventh book of poetry, it won the 2016 Costa Poetry Award and the 2017 Griffin Poetry Prize.

The poems explore themes relating to nature, mutability, cycles and rebirth, as well as mythology. The final poem in the collection, Tithonus (46 Minutes in the Life of the Dawn), is meant to be experienced over the course of 46 minutes as when Oswald performs it live, the amount of time between pitch-darkness and dawn on a typical midsummer morning in her native Devon.

The book was met with critical acclaim upon release.

Critical Reception 
Upon its release, Falling Awake was met with widespread critical acclaim in a variety of publications, including The Guardian, The New Yorker, and The London Magazine.

Writing in The Guardian, Kate Kellaway described it as "an astonishing book of beauty, intensity and poise – a revelation."

Jeremy Noel-Tod wrote that "Falling Awake "glittering in the gaps between things" confirms [Oswald] as one of the most gifted English poets of the past 20 years" in The Sunday Times.

Awards 
 Winner of the 2017 Griffin Poetry Prize.
 Winner of the 2016 Costa Poetry Prize.
 Shortlisted for the 2016 T.S. Eliot Prize.
 Shortlisted for the 2016 Forward Prize.
 Winner of the 2007 Forward Prize for Best Single Poem for "Dunt" which appears in this volume.

References 

2016 poetry books
English poetry collections
Costa Book Award-winning works
Jonathan Cape books